This is a list of the 16 members of the European Parliament for Finland in the 1994 to 1999 session.

List

Party representation

Finland
List
1996